Billboard Top Country Hits is a series of compilation albums released by Rhino Records, each featuring ten hit country music recordings from a specific year, mostly number ones on the Billboard country singles chart. In all, 15 albums were released spanning the years 1959–1968 (released in 1990) and 1986–1990 (released in 1993).

1959

The first volume, covering the year of 1959, contains seven tracks that reached No. 1 on the Billboard Hot C&W Sides chart with the remaining three tracks all peaking in the top five.

Track information and credits taken from the album's liner notes.

1960

Four of the tracks included on this album reached No. 1 on the Billboard Hot C&W Sides chart during 1960. One of the tracks — "El Paso" by Marty Robbins, was also a chart topper on the Billboard Hot 100. Also included in the track lineup is the year's No. 1 song, "Please Help Me I'm Falling" by Hank Locklin. The remaining six tracks all peaked in the top ten.

Track information and credits taken from the album's liner notes.

1961

Seven of the tracks included on this album reached No. 1 on the Billboard Hot Country Singles chart during 1961, including the year's No. 1 song, "I Fall to Pieces" by Patsy Cline. Also included is "Big Bad John" by Jimmy Dean, a crossover hit which spent five weeks atop the Billboard Hot 100. The other three tracks all peaked in the top ten of the country chart.

Track information and credits taken from the album's liner notes.

1962

Five of the tracks included on this album reached No. 1 on the Billboard Hot Country Singles chart during 1962, including the year's No. 1 song, "Wolverton Mountain" by Claude King. The other five tracks all peaked in the top five.

Track information and credits taken from the album's liner notes.

1963

Seven of the tracks included on this album reached No. 1 on the Billboard Hot Country Singles chart during 1963, including the year's No. 1 song, "Still" by Bill Anderson. The other three tracks all peaked in the Top 5.

Track information and credits taken from the album's liner notes.

1964

Eight of the tracks included on this album reached No. 1 on the Billboard Hot Country Singles chart during 1964, including the year's No. 1 song, "My Heart Skips a Beat" by Buck Owens. The other two tracks — "Chug-A-Lug" by Roger Miller and "The Race Is On" by George Jones — peaked in the top five.

Track information and credits taken from the album's liner notes.

1965

Eight of the tracks included on this album reached No. 1 on the Billboard Hot Country Singles chart during 1965. The other two tracks — "Truck Drivin' Son-of-a-Gun" by Dave Dudley and "I'll Keep Holding On (Just to Your Love)" by Sonny James — peaked in the top five.

Track information and credits taken from the album's liner notes.

1966

Eight of the tracks included on this album reached No. 1 on the Billboard Hot Country Singles chart during 1966, including the year's No. 1 song, "Almost Persuaded" by David Houston. The other two tracks — "You Ain't Woman Enough" by Loretta Lynn and "Tippy-Toeing" by the Harden Trio — peaked at No. 2.

Track information and credits taken from the album's liner notes.

1967

Each of the tracks on this album reached No. 1 on the Billboard Hot Country Singles chart during 1967. Included is the year's No. 1 song, "All the Time" by Jack Greene.

Track information and credits taken from the album's liner notes.

1968

Each of the tracks reached No. 1 on the Billboard Hot Country Singles chart during 1968. Included is the year's No. 1 song, "Folsom Prison Blues" by Johnny Cash. "Harper Valley PTA" by Jeannie C. Riley also was a No. 1 single on the Billboard Hot 100.

Track information and credits taken from the album's liner notes.

1986

Each of the tracks in this volume reached No. 1 on the Billboard Hot Country Singles chart during 1986 and early 1987.

Track information and credits taken from the album's liner notes.

1987

Each of the tracks in this volume reached No. 1 on the Billboard Hot Country Singles chart during 1987 and early 1988.

Track information and credits taken from the album's liner notes.

1988

Each of the tracks in this volume reached No. 1 on the Billboard Hot Country Singles chart during 1988 and early 1989.

Track information and credits taken from the album's liner notes.

1989

Each of the tracks in this volume reached No. 1 on the Billboard Hot Country Singles chart during 1989 and early 1990.

Track information and credits taken from the album's liner notes.

1990

Each of the tracks in this volume reached No. 1 on the Billboard Hot Country Singles chart during 1990 and early 1991.

Track information and credits taken from the album's liner notes.

References

1990 compilation albums
1993 compilation albums
Country Hits
Country albums by American artists
Country music compilation albums
Various artists albums